The Tamil Nadu cricket team is a domestic cricket team run by Tamil Nadu Cricket Association representing the state of Tamil Nadu, India.It has been one of the most dominating teams in white ball cricket in domestic circuit The team plays in Ranji Trophy, the top tier of the domestic first-class cricket tournament in India and in List A tournaments Vijay Hazare Trophy and Syed Mushtaq Ali Trophy. They have won the Ranji Trophy twice and have finished runners-up nine times. They are the team that has won the Vijay Hazare Trophy  and Syed Mushtaq Ali Trophy  most often. They were the first team to win the Syed Mushtaq Ali Trophy. The team was known as Madras until the 1970–71 season before renaming of Madras state to Tamil Nadu. Tamil Nadu is the only team to win the five different Indian domestic trophies (Ranji Trophy, Irani Trophy, Syed Mushtaq Ali Trophy, Vijay Hazare Trophy and Deodhar Trophy) in India.

Home ground
The team is based at the M. A. Chidambaram Stadium, named after M. A. Chidambaram a former president of the BCCI. Established in 1916, it has a capacity of 38,000 and had floodlights installed in 1996.

Honours
 Ranji Trophy
 Winners (2): 1954–55, 1987–88
 Runners-up (10): 1935–36, 1940–41, 1967–68, 1972–73, 1991–92, 1995–96, 2002–03, 2003–04, 2011–12, 2014–15

 Irani Cup
 Winners:  1988-89

 Vijay Hazare Trophy
 Winners (5): 2002-03, 2004-05, 2008-09, 2009-10, 2016-17
 Runners-up (2): 2019-20, 2021-22

 Deodhar Trophy
 Winners: 2016-17

 Syed Mushtaq Ali Trophy
 Winners (3): 2006-07, 2020-21, 2021-22
 Runners-up: 2019-20

Famous players

Current squad 
 Players with international caps are listed in bold.

Updated as on 24 January 2023

Records

References

Indian first-class cricket teams
Cricket in Tamil Nadu
Sports teams in Tamil Nadu
Cricket clubs established in 1864
1864 establishments in India